Mankota is a village in the Canadian province of Saskatchewan within the Rural Municipality of Mankota No. 45 and Census Division No. 3. The village is located on Highway 18, about 150 km southeast of the City of Swift Current. It is also near the villages of Kincaid, Ferland, Hazenmore, and Glentworth.

History 
The community acquired a post office in 1911 and was named by combining Manitoba and North Dakota, the original homes of many of its initial settlers.
Mankota incorporated as a village on February 3, 1941.

Demographics 

Economy and businesses 
Mankota has a stockyard for the sale of cattle from many farms in the area. Other businesses include the Grasslands Inn, a motel/restaurant, a general store, an Innovation Credit Union, a small clinic/old folks home, a bowling alley, a town hall, a library, a fire station, a smaller community centre, an auto repair shop, a Petro-Canada gas station, and a Canada Post office.

In 2016, Weil Group Resources of Dallas constructed a $10 million helium processing facility near Mankota to supply refined, industrial-grade helium gas to world markets, reviving a mineral resource which was previously established in Saskatchewan.

Education 
Mankota has one school that covers Kindergarten through Grade 12 in the Prairie South School Division. Enrollment for the 2008-2009 year was at 78, declining to 61 in 2011, and declining further every year on average. 

There are 40 students enrolled for the 2022-23 school year, seven of which are in Grade 12.

Attractions
 Grasslands National Park, one of Canada's newer national parks and is located in southern Saskatchewan along the Montana border.
 Cypress Hills Interprovincial Park, straddling the Alberta-Saskatchewan border southeast of Medicine Hat, is Canada's only interprovincial park.
 Mankota Stockyards, has cow sales every Friday all year long.
 The Mankota Rodeo is held in May every year.

Notable people 

 David Anthony Rodney, Member of the Legislative Assembly of Alberta for Calgary-Lougheed, November 22, 2004 – November 1, 2017
 Neil O Webster, photographer

Climate

See also
 List of villages in Saskatchewan
 List of geographic names derived from portmanteaus

References

Villages in Saskatchewan
Mankota No. 45, Saskatchewan
Division No. 3, Saskatchewan